Son of a Gun is the debut extended play single by Glasgow alternative rock group The Vaselines. The title-song of the EP came to a wider audience after a Nirvana Peel session version of it, along with "Molly's Lips", was released on their compilation album Incesticide.

"You Think You're A Man" is a cover of a song written by Geoff Deane for the cult-film actor Divine.

Track listing
All songs written by Frances McKee and Eugene Kelly except where noted.

Side A
"Son of a Gun"
"Rory Rides Me Raw"

Side B
"You Think You're a Man" (Geoff Deane)

Personnel
 Eugene Kelly — vocals, guitars
 Frances McKee — vocals, guitars

Additional personnel
 Aggi Wright — keyboards on "Son of a Gun"
 Stephen Pastel - Producer, Additional guitar on "You Think You're a Man"
 Gordon Rintoul — engineer

Charts

References

1987 EPs
The Vaselines albums